Andreas Karamanolis (born 2 September 2001) is a Cypriot professional footballer who plays for Cypriot First Division club Doxa Katokopias. He plays as a centre-back.

Club career

Early career
Born in Larnaca, started his career in the youth academy of Cypriot club Ayia Napa.

Doxa Katokopias
On 17 August 2021, it was officially announced that Karamanolis signed for Doxa.

He made his professional debut in the Cypriot First Division for Doxa on 12 September 2021 in a game against Anorthosis Famagusta.

Career statistics

References

External links
 

2001 births
Living people
Cypriot footballers
Cyprus youth international footballers
Association football midfielders
Doxa Katokopias FC players
People from Larnaca